The COol Companions ON Ultrawide orbiTS (COCONUTS) program is a large-scale survey for wide-orbit planetary and substellar companions considered the first survey of this type of celestial bodies. In 2021, the team announced COCONUTS-2b, the closest exoplanet directly imaged ever. The program is a dedicated large-scale search for wide-orbit giant planets and brown dwarf companions, targeting a  sample of 300,000 stars. By using multi-wavelength photometry and multi-epoch astrometry, astronomers are able to assess the candidates' companionship and ultracool nature.

List of discoveries

See also 
 List of exoplanet search projects

References 

Exoplanet search projects